The Democratic People's Party (PDP) was a political party in San Marino.

History
The party was established in 1974 as a one-MP breakaway from the Sammarinese Christian Democratic Party. In the general elections later that year it received 2% of the vote, winning one of the 60 seats in the Grand and General Council. However, it did not contest any further elections.

References

Catholic political parties
Christian democratic parties in Europe
Defunct political parties in San Marino
Political parties established in 1974
1974 establishments in San Marino